This is a list of units and commands that took part in the Battle of Dien Bien Phu during the First Indochina War, with the major commands that took part in operations.

Operational Group North-West (GONO)

Command

Infantry

Parachute Infantry

Armoured Cavalry

Artillery

Engineers

Service Units

Medical Service Units

Intelligence

Air Force

Air Units Support

Air Force

Naval Air Arm

U.S. Central Intelligence Agency

Việt Minh

Command

Infantry

Artillery

References

 Bergot, Erwan. Les 170 jours de Dien Bien Phu. Presses de la Cité, 1979
 Brancion, Henri de. Dien Bien Phu: Artilleurs dans la fournaise. Presses de la Cité, 1993
 Bruge, Roger. Les hommes de Dien Bien Phu. Perrin, 1999
 Fall, Bernard. Hell in a very small place. Lippincott, 1967
 Rocolle, Pierre. Pourquoi Dien Bien Phu. Flammarion, 1968
 Windrow, Martin. The last valley. Weidenfeld & Nicolson, 2004
 Võ, Nguyên Giáp. "Tổng tập hồi ký". Nhà xuất bản Quân Đội Nhân Dân, 2006(Vo, Nguyen Giap. "Memoirs Collection". People's Army Publishing House, Hanoi, 2006)
 "Lịch sử Bộ Tổng tham mưu trong kháng chiến chống thực dân Pháp 1945–1954". Nhà xuất bản Quân Đội Nhân Dân, 1991("History of the General Staff in the Resistance War against French Colonialists 1945–1954". People's Army Publishing House, Hanoi, 1991)
 "Đại đoàn Quân Tiên Phong". Nhà xuất bản Quân Đội Nhân Dân, 1966.(The "Vanguard" Division. People's Army Publishing House, Hanoi, 1966)
 "Sư đoàn 304 – Tập 1: 1950–1954". Nhà xuất bản Quân đội Nhân dân, 1980("The 304th Division – Volume 1 (1950–1954)". People's Army Publishing House, Hanoi, 1980)
 "Lịch sử sư đoàn bộ binh 312 1950–2000". Nhà xuất bản Quân đội Nhân dân, 2001.("History of the 312th Infantry Division 1950–2000". People's Army Publishing House, Hanoi, 2001)
 "Sư đoàn 316 – Tập 1: 1951–1954". Nhà xuất bản Quân đội Nhân dân, 1981("The 316th division – Volume 1 (1951–1954)". People's Army Publishing House, Hanoi, 1981)
 "Pháo binh nhân dân Việt Nam: Những chặng đường chiến đấu". Nhà xuất bản Quân đội Nhân dân, 1982("Vietnamese People's Artillery: Tracks of Combat". People's Army Publishing House, Hanoi, 1982'')

External links
 Website of the battle
 Source for Airplane crash at Dien Bien Phu (Aviation-Safety.net)
 Knights of the Legion of Honor to seven CAT pilots at Dien Bien Phu US secret involvement made official (French ambassy in USA)
 CAT pilots to be honored by France

Orders of battle

vi:Trận Điện Biên Phủ